Hydriomena expurgata is a species of moth in the family Geometridae first described by William Barnes and James Halliday McDunnough in 1918. It is found in North America.

The MONA or Hodges number for Hydriomena expurgata is 7224.

Subspecies
Four subspecies belong to Hydriomena expurgata:
 Hydriomena expurgata alticola McDunnough, 1954 c g
 Hydriomena expurgata expurgata g
 Hydriomena expurgata franclemonti McDunnough, 1952 c g
 Hydriomena expurgata nicolensis McDunnough, 1954 c g
Data sources: i = ITIS, c = Catalogue of Life, g = GBIF, b = BugGuide

References

Further reading

External links

 

Hydriomena
Articles created by Qbugbot
Moths described in 1918